The purple-throated euphonia (Euphonia chlorotica) is a songbird species in the family Fringillidae. It was formerly placed in the Thraupidae.

It is found in Argentina, Bolivia, Brazil, Colombia, Ecuador, French Guiana, Guyana, Paraguay, Peru, Suriname, Uruguay, and Venezuela.

Its natural habitats are subtropical or tropical moist lowland forests and heavily degraded former forest.

In 1760 the French zoologist Mathurin Jacques Brisson included a description of the purple-throated euphonia in his Ornithologie based on a specimen collected in Cayenne, French Guiana. He used the French name Le tangara noir et jaune de Cayenne and the Latin Tangara Cayanensis Nigrolutea. Although Brisson coined Latin names, these do not conform to the binomial system and are not recognised by the International Commission on Zoological Nomenclature. When in 1766 the Swedish naturalist Carl Linnaeus updated his Systema Naturae for the twelfth edition, he added 240 species that had been previously described by Brisson. One of these was the purple-throated euphonia. Linnaeus included a brief description, coined the binomial name Tanagra chlorotica and cited Brisson's work. The specific name chlorotica is from the Ancient Greek khlōrotēs "greenness". This species is now placed in the genus Euphonia that was introduced by the French zoologist Anselme Gaëtan Desmarest in 1806.  There are five subspecies.

References

purple-throated euphonia
Birds of South America
purple-throated euphonia
purple-throated euphonia
Taxonomy articles created by Polbot